The crumbling skull rule is a well-established legal doctrine used in some tort law systems.  It holds that where a plaintiff had a condition or injury that predates the tort and would have naturally deteriorated or worsened over time (e.g. a crumbling skull), the defendant is not responsible to the degree that the condition or injury would have naturally worsened over time.  A defendant is only liable for the degree the injury was worsened or the hastening or acceleration of the damage caused by the tort.  The crumbling skull rule should not be confused with the related thin skull rule.

The concept is sometimes applied without specific reference to the crumbling skull rule, instead being expressed as a non-absolute application of the thin skull rule.

References

Tort law
Legal doctrines and principles